Lester Farnsworth Wire (September 3, 1887 – April 14, 1958) was credited with the invention of the electric traffic light in 1912, in Salt Lake City. Wire worked as a detective for the Salt Lake City police force. The original traffic light, based on a semaphore system, had been invented in London in 1868 by John Peake Knight, but had not been a success.

The earliest known patent for a traffic light in the United States was U.S.Patent # 1,251,666, issued January 1, 1918, to J.B. Hoge of Cleveland, Ohio.

Biography
Lester Wire attended Salt Lake High School. In high school, Wire was a football star and expert marksman and also helped create the first men's and women's basketball games. He later received appointment to West Point Military Academy by Senator, Reed E. Smoot, but was unable to attend. In 1909, he was enrolled in the University of Utah as a law student, which he found too expensive and quit to join the Salt Lake City Police in 1910. In 1912, he was appointed to head the first traffic squad at the age of 24 by police chief B.F. Grant. As head of the traffic squad, he created the first regulation codes in Salt Lake City and appointed patrolmen at the busy Main Street and 200 South area. The patrolmen would stand on small platforms and to be fair, would time traffic each way. He wanted a better way to control traffic so that the patrol men did not have to stand for long hours with differing weather conditions. With Matthew 5:15 as his inspiration ("Neither do men light a candle, and put it under a bushel, but on a candlestick; and it giveth light unto all"), he created his first electric traffic signal.

The first prototype was a wooden box with a pitched roof that contained red and green lights on all four sides. Wire reportedly dipped the bulbs in red and green paint to get the color and choose the colors according to nautical right-or way or railroad usage and were also nature based. It was then mounted to a 10-foot pole, wired to the electrical lines of the trolley cars. Once installed, it was hand operated by a patrolmen in a booth by the side of the road. When the first traffic light was installed, pedestrians would yell at drivers waiting in cars for the light to change, "Are you waiting to see if the birdies will come out?" or "I saw a birdie that time; now you can go?" Because of its birdhouse-like appearance, the traffic light became known as "Wire's bird cage", "Wire's pigeon house" and the "flashing bird house."

He devised a durable metal stoplight, using the smokestack from an old locomotive engine for the frame, but without a yellow caution light. He thought of having it patented, but ended up not doing so. Some believed the reason to be that Wire had been drafted to serve in World War I, and could not see the patent process through. Based on Wire's designs, the lights were first installed on August 5, 1914 in Cleveland, Ohio on the corner of East 105th street and Euclid Avenue. Five years after Wire's invention, Salt Lake City became the first interconnected traffic signal system in the United States.

Wire went back to being a detective and retired in 1946. And after his death in 1958, in March 1963, the Wire Memorial Museum and Historical Association was started in his family home. Wire never married but his sister, Edith, tried to secure the original stoplight from the Tracy Aviary where it had been used as a birdhouse, but it had disappeared shortly after Wire's death. The original metal stoplight had been displayed in Syracuse, New York, for many years. In 1964, Edith asked if it could be returned to Utah for display in the museum, but the people in New York replied that it had been thrown out two days before her letter arrived. A replica of Wire's first traffic light can be seen at the UDOT, Traffic Operations Center located at 2060 South and 2760 West in Salt Lake City.
       
Edith died in 1973. She left her inheritance to keep the museum operating, but there were not enough funds to do that. Trustees for the estate referred the problem to the courts. As a solution, the Utah State Department of Transportation agreed to use the assets of the estate to create and maintain a suitable memorial to the inventor of the traffic light. To that end, the Lester Farnsworth Wire Memorial Library was included in the new Department of Transportation building at 4501 South 2700 West in Salt Lake City.

Death
He was buried at Salt Lake City Cemetery.

Evolution of the Traffic Signal
The first traffic island was put into use in San Francisco, California in 1907, and left-hand drive became the standard for American cars in 1908.  Two Years before (1910) Wire, Ernest Sirrine, in Chicago made the first traffic light that used the non-illuminated words "stop" and "proceed". And the first center painted divide appeared in 1911 in Michigan, and the first "No Left Turn" sign arrived in 1916.

Eight years after Wire's invention, in Detroit in 1920, a detective named William Potts introduced the amber light and a series of electrical controls that would ultimately resulted in the automatic traffic light. Potts did not apply for a patent, but the first inventor to do so was Garret Morgan, who patented his invention of the traffic light with a STOP, GO and a third position for pedestrians. Morgan eventually sold his patent to General Electric where it was mass-produced.

References

External links

1887 births
1958 deaths
American Latter Day Saints
American police detectives
Burials at Salt Lake City Cemetery
People from Salt Lake City
20th-century American inventors